Turriff Cottage Hospital is a community hospital in Turriff, Aberdeenshire, Scotland. It is managed by NHS Grampian.

History
The hospital was designed by James Duncan as a joint infectious diseases hospital to serve both the burgh and district. It opened as the Turriff Joint Hospital in 1895. It closed in 1932 but re-opened with a new nurses' home in 1936. The facility had some refurbishment in 1998 and it became the first site in NHS Grampian to become completely smoke-free in January 2014.

Services
The hospital has 19 beds and is attached to the local health centre. It has x-ray facilities and a 24-hour minor injuries unit.

References

External links
 Friends of Turriff Hospital

Hospital buildings completed in 1895
NHS Grampian
NHS Scotland hospitals
Hospitals in Aberdeenshire
1895 establishments in Scotland
Hospitals established in 1895
Cottage hospitals
Turriff